The Heavy Soul Experience is the first full-length studio album from Mother Superior. It features the original Wilson-Blake-Mackenroth line-up.

Track listing 
"Can Ya Hear Me?" – 5:10    
"Way Tin Onya" – 3:18    
"Sneakin" – 3:26    
"Guess I'm A Fool Again" – 4:58    
"Valentine's Day" – 2:10   
"The Wiggle" – 4:31   
"Right On Time" – 5:28    
"Part Time Loser" – 4:04     
"You Don't Miss Your Water" – 3:44
"Fools Prayer" – 8:46
"An Extra Slice of Heavy Soul" – 2:47

Personnel 
 Jim Wilson – vocals, guitars
 Marcus Blake – bass
 Jason Mackenroth – drums

Mother Superior (band) albums
1996 debut albums